The Bugkalot (also Ilongot or Ibilao) are a tribe inhabiting the southern Sierra Madre and Caraballo Mountains, on the east side of Luzon in the Philippines, primarily in the provinces of Nueva Vizcaya and Nueva Ecija and along the mountain border between the provinces of Quirino and Aurora. They are also commonly referred to as "Ilongot", especially in older studies, but nowadays, the endonym Bugkalot is preferred in modern ethnic research. They were formerly headhunters.

Presently, there are about 87,000 Bugkalots. The Bugkalots tend to inhabit areas close to rivers, as they provide a food source and a means for transportation. Their native language is the Bugkalot language, currently spoken by about 50,000 people. They also speak the Ilocano & Tagalog languages.

Culture 

In Ivan Salva's study in 1980 of the Bugkalots, she described "gender differences related to the positive cultural value placed on adventure, travel, and knowledge of the external world." Bugkalot men, more often than women, visited distant places. They acquired knowledge of the outside world, amassed experiences there, and returned to share their knowledge, adventures, and feelings in a public oratory in order to pass on their knowledge to others. The Bugkalot men received acclaim as a result of their experiences. Because they lacked external experience on which to base knowledge and expression, Bugkalot women had inferior prestige.

Based on Michelle Rosaldo's study and findings of other stateless societies, anthropologists must distinguish between prestige systems and actual power within a society. Just because a male has a high level of prestige, he may not own much economic or political power compared to others that are less prestigious within the society.

Renato Rosaldo went on to study headhunting among the Bugkalots in his book Ilongot Headhunting, 1883-1974: A Study in Society and History. He notes headhunting raids are often associated with bereavement, a rage, and expiation at the loss of a loved one.

Gallery of Bugkalot art

References

 
 Rosaldo, Michelle Zimbalist,  Lamphere Louise. A Mulher. A Cultura e a Sociedade. ("Woman. The Culture and Society") Brazil: RJ. Paz e Terra, 1979. Coleção O Mundo hoje. ("The world today") 31. p. 58.

External links

Bugkalot
 NPR Listen to: High Voltage (Emotions Part 2) - Liget 🔊 Listen Now: High Voltage (Emotions Part 2) Invisibilia: A Man Finds An Explosive Emotion Locked In A Word

Indigenous peoples of the Philippines
Ethnic groups in Luzon